Box Hill or Boxhill may refer to:

Places

Australia
 Box Hill, New South Wales, a suburb of Sydney, Australia
 Box Hill, Victoria, a suburb of Melbourne, Australia
 Box Hill railway station, Melbourne

England
 Box Hill, Surrey, a hill in England named for the box woodland it features
 Box Hill & Westhumble railway station
 Box Hill, Wiltshire, a village in England

Other countries
 Box Hill railway station, Wellington, a station in New Zealand
 Boxhill (Louisville), a historic house in the United States

Other uses